Douglas Island is a tidal island in the U.S. state of Alaska.

Douglas Island may also refer to:

Douglas Island (British Columbia), Canada
Douglas Island (Western Australia), see List of islands of Western Australia, D-G
Douglas Island (Nunavut), Canada  between Dolphin and Union Strait and Coronation Gulf and Cape Krusenstern (southwest) and Lady Franklin Point (northeast)
Douglas Islands, in Antarctica
Protection Island (Nanaimo), formally named Douglas Island